Langdon Bay may refer to:

Langdon Bay, Kent
Langdon Bay, Minnesota